"Happiness" is a song by American singer-songwriter Elliott Smith. It was released on February 8, 2000 by record label DreamWorks as the first single from his fifth studio album, Figure 8. It was also released on 7-inch vinyl by Cavity Search.

Recording and content 

Jon Brion sings backup vocals on "Happiness".

On early recording reels, the song was labeled as "Tom's Start".

Release 

"Happiness" was released on February 8, 2000 by record label DreamWorks as the first single from his fifth studio album, Figure 8. The single did not chart in the United States.

The single version is a slightly different mix of the song that was released on the album. On Figure 8, the track is labeled as "Happiness/The Gondola Man" due to the short instrumental that plays after "Happiness" ends. On the single, an entirely different instrumental follows the song. The instrumental that follows on the single is a reversed clip of "Take a Fall", a song recorded in Smith's early duo called A Murder of Crows. This song shouldn't be confused with other Smith songs "Taking a Fall" and "How to Take a Fall".

Critical reception 

CMJ New Music Report wrote, "While the tune's production recalls the shimmer of XO, it possesses curiously upbeat energy atypical for Smith".

Track listing 

 "Happiness (Single Version)"
 "Son of Sam (Acoustic Version)"

Personnel
Elliott Smith – vocals, guitars, bass, drums, piano, organ, marching drum
Jon Brion – backing vocals

References 

Elliott Smith songs
2000 singles
Song recordings produced by Tom Rothrock
2000 songs
Songs written by Elliott Smith
DreamWorks Records singles